The women's 800 metres event at the 1994 Commonwealth Games was held at the Centennial Stadium in Victoria, British Columbia.

Medalists

Results

Heats

Final

References

Athletics at the 1994 Commonwealth Games
1994
1994 in women's athletics